Pia Tapsell (born 2 August 1998) is a New Zealand rugby union player. She made her debut for New Zealand against Canada at the 2019 Women's Rugby Super Series on 28 June at San Diego.

Biography 
Tapsell is from the Ngāti Whakauae and Te Arawa iwi. She started in all of the Black Ferns six test matches of 2019. She later appeared for the New Zealand Development XV in Fiji for the Oceania Rugby Women's Championship. Tapsell played for the Possibles in a Black Ferns trial match in 2020 and then featured for the Black Ferns against the New Zealand Barbarians.

Tapsell previously played for North Harbour, she began playing for Bay of Plenty at the 2020 Farah Palmer Cup. In 2021 she was named in the Chiefs squad for their historic clash with the Blues. It was the first-ever women's Super Rugby match to be played in New Zealand. Later that year she signed a contract with the Chiefs for the inaugural season of Super Rugby Aupiki.

References

External links
Black Ferns Profile

1998 births
Living people
New Zealand women's international rugby union players
New Zealand female rugby union players
New Zealand Māori rugby union players
Massey University alumni